The 1985–86 BCAFL was the 1st full season of the British Collegiate American Football League, organised by the British Students American Football Association.

For this initial season, four 'charter' Universities competed in a straight double round-robin schedule, without end-of-season playoffs.
University of Hull, playing as the Sharks
University of Manchester, playing as the MPs
Newcastle University, playing as the Scholars
Teesside University, playing as the Demons

Regular season

Owing to Manchester being unable to fulfill their schedule, the season ended early.

References

External links
 Official BUAFL Website
 Official BAFA Website

1985-86
1985 in British sport
1986 in British sport
1985 in American football
1986 in American football